Steve Sutcliffe (born in 1968) is a former British motor racing driver who now works as a motoring journalist. His first serious racing took place in 1993 in the Caterham K Series Championship, where he finished the season second in points.  In 1998 he raced in the TVR Tuscan Challenge, finishing eighth.  He finished fourth in the 1999 season, and sixth in 2000 with two poles and three race wins.

In 2001 he got a drive in the British Touring Car Championship, replacing Thomas Erdos for the final two races at Brands Hatch, in a Lexus IS200 for ABG Motorsport/Total Motorsport.

In 2007, Sutcliffe set competitive times around the National Circuit at Silverstone in Honda's RA 107 Formula One car, and managed speeds of 178 mph along the back straight. He did it in 48.58 seconds compared to Honda F1 test driver James Rossiter 48.18 seconds.

After a long career with Autocar magazine, he has now gone freelance with work appearing in EVO magazine & Autocar's main rival, Auto Express amongst others.

Racing record

Complete British Touring Car Championship results
(key) (Races in bold indicate pole position - 1 point awarded all races) (Races in italics indicate fastest lap - 1 point awarded all races) (* signifies that driver lead feature race for at least one lap - 1 point awarded)

† Not eligible for points.

References

External links 
 BTCC Pages Profile
 

Living people
British Touring Car Championship drivers
English racing drivers
1968 births
Porsche Carrera Cup GB drivers
Britcar 24-hour drivers